Tadeusz Wieloch (born October 10, 1950, Lund, Sweden) is a Swedish neuroscientist and entrepreneur, professor at Lund University, Sweden.

Tadeusz Wieloch, son of Krystyna and Antoni Wieloch, Polish immigrants to Sweden in 1945. He received his PhD in 1981 in medical- and physiological chemistry at Lund University. In 1993 he was promoted to professor of Neurobiology.

Tadeusz Wieloch is a corresponding member of the Polish Academy of Sciences since 2005 and chaired the Brain Foundation's Scientific Committee from 2008 to 2014. He holds several patents and has founded three companies e.g. Sinntaxis AB in 2017.

References

1950 births
Living people
Swedish neuroscientists
Academic staff of Lund University
People from Lund Municipality
20th-century Swedish inventors
21st-century Swedish inventors
Swedish people of Polish descent